In probability theory, the Schramm–Loewner evolution with parameter κ, also known as stochastic Loewner evolution (SLEκ), is a family of random planar curves that have been proven to be the scaling limit of a variety of two-dimensional lattice models in statistical mechanics. Given a parameter κ and a domain in the complex plane U, it gives a family of random curves in U, with κ controlling how much the curve turns. There are two main variants of SLE, chordal SLE which gives a family of random curves from two fixed boundary points, and radial SLE, which gives a family of random curves from a fixed boundary point to a fixed interior point. These curves are defined to satisfy conformal invariance and a domain Markov property.

Besides UST and LERW, the Schramm–Loewner evolution is conjectured or proven to describe the scaling limit of various stochastic processes in the plane, such as critical percolation, the critical Ising model, the double-dimer model, self-avoiding walks, and other critical statistical mechanics models that exhibit conformal invariance. The SLE curves are the scaling limits of interfaces and other non-self-intersecting random curves in these models. The main idea is that the conformal invariance and a certain Markov property inherent in such stochastic processes together make it possible to encode these planar curves into a one-dimensional Brownian motion running on the boundary of the domain (the driving function in Loewner's differential equation). This way, many important questions about the planar models can be translated into exercises in Itô calculus. Indeed, several mathematically non-rigorous predictions made by physicists using conformal field theory have been proven using this strategy.

The Loewner equation

If D is a simply connected, open complex domain not equal to C, and γ  is a simple curve in D starting on the boundary (a continuous function with γ(0) on the boundary of D and γ((0, ∞)) a subset of D), then for each t ≥ 0, the complement Dt of γ([0, t]) is simply connected and therefore conformally isomorphic to D by the Riemann mapping theorem.
Sometimes it is more convenient to use the inverse function gt of ƒt, which is a conformal mapping from Dt to D.

In Loewner's equation, z is in the domain D, t ≥ 0, and the boundary values at time t = 0 are ƒ0(z) = z or g0(z) = z. The equation depends on a driving function ζ(t) taking values in the boundary of D.  If D is the unit disk and the curve γ is parameterized by "capacity", then Loewner's equation is

   or   

When D is the upper half plane the Loewner equation differs from this by changes of variable and is

   or   

The driving function ζ and the curve γ are related by

Example

Let D be the upper half plane and consider an SLE0, so the driving function ζ is a Brownian motion of diffusivity zero. The function ζ is thus identically zero almost surely and

 is the upper half-plane with the line from 0 to  removed.

Schramm–Loewner evolution 
Schramm–Loewner evolution is the random curve γ given by the Loewner equation as in the previous section, for the driving function

where B(t) is Brownian motion on the boundary of D, scaled by some real κ. In other words, Schramm–Loewner evolution is a probability measure on planar curves, given as the image of Wiener measure under this map.

In general the curve γ need not be simple, and the domain Dt is not the complement of γ([0,t]) in D, but is instead the unbounded component of the complement.

There are two versions of SLE, using two families of curves, each depending on a non-negative real parameter κ:

Chordal SLEκ, which is related to curves connecting two points on the boundary of a domain (usually the upper half plane, with the points being 0 and infinity).
Radial SLEκ, which related to curves joining a point on the boundary of a domain to a point in the interior (often curves joining 1 and 0 in the unit disk).

SLE depends on a choice of Brownian motion on the boundary of the domain, and there are several variations depending on what sort of Brownian motion is used: for example it might start at a fixed point, or start at a uniformly distributed point on the unit circle, or might have a built in drift, and so on. The parameter κ controls the rate of diffusion of the Brownian motion, and the behavior of SLE depends critically on its value.

The two domains most commonly used in Schramm–Loewner evolution are the upper half plane and the unit circle. Although the Loewner differential equation in these two cases look different, they are equivalent up to changes of variables as the unit circle and the upper half plane are conformally equivalent. However a conformal equivalence between them does not preserve the Brownian motion on their boundaries used to drive Schramm–Loewner evolution.

Special values of κ

For 0 ≤ κ < 4 the curve γ(t) is simple (with probability 1).
For 4 < κ < 8 the curve γ(t) intersects itself and every point is contained in a loop but the curve is not space-filling (with probability 1).
For κ ≥ 8 the curve γ(t) is space-filling (with probability 1).
κ = 2 corresponds to the loop-erased random walk, or equivalently, branches of the uniform spanning tree.
For κ = 8/3, SLEκ has the restriction property and is conjectured to be the scaling limit of self-avoiding random walks. A version of it is the outer boundary of Brownian motion.
κ = 3 is the limit of interfaces for the Ising model.
κ = 4 corresponds to the path of the harmonic explorer and contour lines of the Gaussian free field.
For κ = 6, SLEκ has the locality property. This arises in the scaling limit of critical percolation on the triangular lattice and conjecturally on other lattices.
κ = 8 corresponds to the path separating the uniform spanning tree from its dual tree.

When SLE corresponds to some conformal field theory, the parameter κ is related to the central charge c
of the conformal field theory by

Each value of c < 1 corresponds to two values of κ, one value κ between 0 and 4, and a "dual" value 16/κ greater than 4. (see  )

 showed that the Hausdorff dimension of the paths (with probability 1) is equal to min(2, 1 + κ/8).

Left passage probability formulas for SLEκ 

The probability of chordal SLEκ γ being on the left of fixed point  was computed by 

This was derived by using the martingale property of

and Itô's lemma to obtain the following partial differential equation for 

Applications
 used SLE6 to prove the conjecture of  that the boundary of planar Brownian motion has fractal dimension 4/3.

Critical percolation on the triangular lattice was proved to be related to SLE6 by Stanislav Smirnov. Combined with earlier work of Harry Kesten, this led to the determination of many of the critical exponents for percolation. This breakthrough, in turn, allowed further analysis of many aspects of this model.

Loop-erased random walk was shown to converge to SLE2 by Lawler, Schramm and Werner. This allowed derivation of many quantitative properties of loop-erased random walk (some of which were derived earlier by Richard Kenyon). The related random Peano curve outlining the uniform spanning tree was shown to converge to SLE8.

Rohde and Schramm showed that κ is related to the fractal dimension of a curve by the following relation

Simulation
Computer programs (Matlab) are presented in this GitHub repository to simulate Schramm Loewner Evolution planar curves.

References

Further reading

 

  (Chapter 6 treats the classical theory of Loewner's equation)
 Schramm's original paper, introducing SLE

External links
 ( video of MSRI lecture)
 (Slides from a talk.)

Stochastic processes
Complex analysis